Dunstan High School is a state secondary school located in Alexandra, in the Central Otago district in the South Island of New Zealand.

Dunstan High School also runs the Tititea Outdoor Education Centre, which is located in the old homestead in the East Matukituki Valley on the outskirts of the Mount Aspiring National Park.

In 2009, the school installed an $800,000 clean-burning heating system, replacing a coal-fuelled system, and constructed a new $2.3 million gymnasium.

Notable alumni
 James Te Huna - first New Zealander to enter the Ultimate Fighting Championships (2010)
 Murray Pierce - All Black rugby player
 Ken Rutherford - New Zealand cricket captain; represented the First XI as a player coach
 Elizabeth van Welie - Olympic swimmer (Sydney 2000) and Commonwealth Games silver medalist in the 200m butterfly (Manchester 2002)
 Bevan Wilson - All Black rugby player

Principals

References

External links
 http://www.dunstan.school.nz/

Secondary schools in Otago
Educational institutions established in 1962
Alexandra, New Zealand
1962 establishments in New Zealand